The Bâtiments du Roi ("King's Buildings") was a division of the Maison du Roi ("King's Household") in France under the Ancien Régime.  It was responsible for building works at the King's residences in and around Paris.

History

The Bâtiments du Roi was created by Henry IV of France to coordinate the building works at his royal palaces.  Formerly, each palace had its own superintendent of works.  Henry gave the task of supervising all works to Maximilien de Béthune, Duke of Sully.

In the 17th century, the responsibilities of the Bâtiments du Roi extended beyond pure building works, to include the manufacture of tapestries and porcelain.  In 1664, Jean-Baptiste Colbert was entitled surintendant et ordonnateur général des bâtiments, arts, tapisseries et manufactures de France ("superintendent and director-general of building, art, tapestries and factories of France").  This title was retained by several of his successors.  Other areas that came within under the control of the Bâtiments du Roi included botanical gardens, and the Royal Academies of painting and sculpture, and of architecture

The wide scope of the responsibilities meant that the superintendent of the Bâtiments du Roi  was effectively a minister of the French king. The director general was assisted by the first architect to the King (premier architecte du Roi) and the first painter to the King (premier peintre du Roi), a staff of inspectors, architects and several hundred workmen.  Much of the work was left to the director's first lieutenants, such as Robert de Cotte and Gilles-Marie Oppenord.

Responsibilities

According to a royal decree of 1 September 1776, the  Bâtiments du Roi was responsible for:
works of construction and maintenance of the main royal residences (the Louvre, the Tuileries, Versailles) and other subsidiary residences (including Saint-Germain-en-Laye, Fontainebleau, Compiègne) and their parks and gardens;
designing and building public works, such as the Place Louis-le-Grand (now the Place Vendôme) and the Invalides;
managing the royal academies of painting and sculpture, and architecture;
production of tapestries at Gobelins and Savonnerie, and porcelain at Sèvres;
oversight of the town of Versailles.

Its responsibilities includes all buildings with a royal connection:
Château de Versailles, Grand Trianon, Petit Trianon
Château de Marly
Château de Fontainebleau
Château de Saint-Germain-en-Laye
Château de Meudon
Palais du Louvre
Palais des Tuileries
Palais-Royal
Palais du Luxembourg
Château de Clagny
Château de Madrid
Château de La Muette
Château de Vincennes
Château de Compiègne
Château de Blois
Château de Chambord
Château d'Amboise
Château de Choisy
Château de Saint-Hubert
Château de Bellevue
Jardin des Plantes
Maison royale de Saint-Louis à Saint-Cyr-l'École
Collège de France
Manufacture des Gobelins
Manufacture de la Savonnerie

Superintendents or directors-general of the Bâtiments du Roi

From 1602 to 1708, and from 1716 to 1726, the head of the Bâtiments du Roi was known as a superintendent (surintendant général).  From 1708 to 1716, and from 1726 to 1791, the head was known as the director general (directeur général)

1602–1621: Maximilien de Béthune (1560–1641), duc de Sully (also surintendant des finances)
1621: Louis d'Aloigny, baron de Rochefort
1622–1624: Jean de Fourcy de Corbinière
1625–1638: Henri de Fourcy de Corbinière
1638–1645: François Sublet de Noyers
1646–1648: Jules Mazarin (1602-1661)
1648–1656: Étienne Le Camus
1656–1664: Antoine de Ratabon
1664–1683: Jean-Baptiste Colbert (1619–1683) (also contrôleur général des finances and Secretary of State of the Maison du Roi)
1683–1691: François Michel Le Tellier de Louvois (1641–1691)
1691–1699: Édouard Colbert de Villacerf (1629–1699)
1699–1708: Jules Hardouin-Mansart (1646–1708) (also Premier architecte du Roi)
1708–1736: Louis Antoine de Pardaillan de Gondrin (1665–1736), duc d'Antin
1736–1745: Philibert Orry (1689–1747) (also contrôleur général des finances)
1745–1751: Charles François Paul Le Normant de Tournehem (1684–1751)
1751–1773: Abel-François Poisson de Vandières (1727–1781), marquis de Marigny
1773–1774 : Joseph Marie Terray (1715–1778) (also contrôleur général des finances)
1774–1789: Charles Claude Flahaut de La Billarderie (1730–1810), comte d'Angiviller

See also
Premier Architecte du Roi

References

This article is based on a translation of the equivalent article of the French Wikipedia, dated 18 July 2006

Ancien Régime French architecture
 
1620 establishments in France
Ancien Régime